Andrea Suppa (1628 in Messina, Sicily – 1671) was an Italian painter and architect.

He trained in Messina under Bartolomeo Tricomi and later under the Flemish painter Abraham Casembroot (1594–1658), who had moved to Messina. Other local pupils of Casembroot included Filippo Giannetto and Domenico Guargena. A pupil of Suppa was Antonio Bova. Many of Suppa's works were destroyed by the 1908 earthquake. He helped design the Sanctuary of Montevergine (1654) in Messina. He painted the frescoes in the chapel of St Gregory in the Church of the Santissima Annunziata in Messina. He also helped design the stained glass windows for the church of San Domenico in Messina. He painted frescoes for the Oratory of St Francis, attached to the Church of San Domenico.

References
Jakob Philipp Hackert and Giuseppe Grosso-Cacopardo: Memorie De' Pittori Messinesi E Degli Esteri che in Messina fiorirono dal secolo XII. fino al secolo XIX. - Messina: Tipografia Pappalardo. (1821). 
Francesco Susino, Le Vite de' Pittori Messinesi, testo, introduzione e note bibliografiche a cura di Valentino Martinelli, Le Monnier, Florence, (1960). 

1628 births
1671 deaths
17th-century Italian painters
Italian male painters
Painters from Messina
Italian Baroque painters
Fresco painters